Wulang may refer to:

Wulang, Myanmar, a village
Wulang, Tibet, a village